Vasilikos is a village and a community in the southeastern part of the municipality and the island of Zakynthos. The community consists of the villages Vasilikos (population 285 in 2011), Agios Ioannis (pop. 8),
Ano Vasilikos (pop. 280) and Xirokastello (pop. 226) and the uninhabited island Kalonisi. The village Vasilikos is situated at the easternmost point of Zakynthos, 11 km southeast of Zakynthos (city). The village Xirokastello is situated halfway between Argasi and Vasilikos, at the eastern foot of the hill Skopos. 

The Vasilikos peninsula in the south-east of the island comprises folded land with low, pine-forested mountains and quiet coves. Most of it has been protected from large-scale development because of the loggerhead turtles that breed on Gerakas beach. Vasilikos is the main community on the peninsula. It has a rugged coastline with numerous beaches, known for their good swimming conditions. Vasilikos is also famous for its hotels, villas and restaurants. The beach resort Porto Roma lies east of the village.

Historical population

See also
List of settlements in Zakynthos

References

External links
zanteweb.gr

Populated places in Zakynthos